Adam Vrahnos (born 1 October 1992) is a Greece international rugby league footballer who plays as a  forward for the London Broncos in the Betfred Championship.

He previously played for the London Skolars in Betfred League 1, and spent time on loan from the Broncos at the Skolars in League 1.

Background
Vrahnos was born in Australia and is of Greek heritage.

He is a qualified solicitor.

His brother Jake Vrahnos is a fellow Greek international.

Playing career

Club career
In 2021 Vrahnos joined the London Skolars in League 1

He joined the London Broncos at the start of the 2022 season.

Vrahnos spent time on loan from the Broncos at the Skolars in League 1.

International career
In 2018 Vrahnos made his international début for  against .

He was also selected for the 2018 Emerging Nations World Championship and Greece's World Cup Qualification squad.

In 2022 Vrahnos was named in the Greece squad for the 2021 Rugby League World Cup, the first ever Greek Rugby League squad to compete in a World Cup.

He played his first game of the tournament, starting in the second row against .

References

External links
London Broncos profile
Greece profile
Greek profile

1992 births
Living people
Australian rugby league players
Australian people of Greek descent
Greece national rugby league team players
London Broncos players
London Skolars players
Rugby league second-rows
Australian expatriate rugby league players
Australian expatriate sportspeople in England
Greek expatriate sportspeople in England